Alucita palodactyla is a moth of the family Alucitidae. It is found in Germany, France, Spain, Portugal, Italy, the Republic of Macedonia, Turkey, Hungary and Iran.

Adults are on wing adults in May and from July to September, probably in two generations per year.

The larvae feed on Scabiosa rutaefolia. They live within the flowers and on seeds of their host plant.

References

Moths described in 1847
Alucitidae
Moths of Europe
Moths of the Middle East
Taxa named by Philipp Christoph Zeller